Thomas Mitchell Herr (born April 4, 1956) is an American former professional baseball second baseman, who played in Major League Baseball (MLB) for the St. Louis Cardinals, Minnesota Twins, Philadelphia Phillies, San Francisco Giants, and New York Mets, from  to . Although he never won a Gold Glove Award, Herr retired with the highest all-time career fielding percentage for National League second basemen (.989), a figure that was matched and surpassed a few years later when Hall of Famer Ryne Sandberg retired.

Playing career

Herr started his minor league career with the Johnson City Cardinals in 1975. Two years later, he led the league with 156 hits, 80 runs, 50 stolen bases, and 515 at-bats while playing for St. Petersburg. Herr played in the 1982, 1985, and 1987 World Series – all with the Cardinals, finishing fifth in the MVP voting and making his only appearance in the All-Star Game in 1985. During the 1985 season, he set career highs in nearly every statistical category, including 110 RBIs which came along with only 8 home runs. A rare feat in the modern era of baseball, Herr remains the last NL player to drive in 100 or more runs in a season while hitting fewer than 10 home runs. Paul Molitor is the most recent AL and MLB player to drive in 100 or more runs in a season while hitting fewer than 10 home runs (9 home runs, 113 RBI in 1996). Early in the 1988 season he was traded to the Twins for Tom Brunansky.

In a 13-season career, he batted .271 with 28 home runs and 574 RBIs in 1,514 games. He had 1,450 career hits in 5349 at bats. An excellent second baseman, Herr recorded a career .989 fielding percentage. He is perhaps best remembered for hitting a walk-off grand slam in extra innings against the New York Mets on April 18, 1987. After Herr hit the grand slam many fans at Busch Stadium threw their stadium give-away seat cushions onto the field in celebration. The grand slam is also well known for Jack Buck's memorable call on KMOX radio.

Management career
Herr was hired in November 2004 as the first manager of his hometown Lancaster Barnstormers, a team in the independent Atlantic League of Professional Baseball, and led the team to the 2006 Atlantic League championship. His success in Lancaster piqued the interest of the Washington Nationals, resulting in a managerial position with the Single-A Hagerstown Suns for the 2007 season. The Suns finished last in the Southern Atlantic League in 2007 with a 55–81 record. Following the 2007 season, Herr left the Nationals organization after his request to manage their Double-A affiliate, the Harrisburg Senators, was refused. After leaving the Nationals, he sought employment with other major league organizations, including the St. Louis Cardinals, without success. Herr then sought to return to the Barnstormers as their manager for the 2008 season, but lost out to Von Hayes. In December 2008, the Barnstormers announced that Hayes has hired Herr to be his bench coach in 2009.

Family
Tom Herr's oldest son, Aaron, was drafted by the Atlanta Braves in the first round during the 2001 season. He played the 2005 season with the Springfield Cardinals, the Double-A affiliate of the St. Louis Cardinals. Aaron was later traded to the Cincinnati Reds in 2006, and allocated to their former class AA team, the Chattanooga Lookouts. In mid-2006, he was promoted to the class AAA Louisville Bats, where he played his best season. Aaron had a short stint with the class AAA Buffalo Bisons, but a severe groin injury caused him to be reassigned to the Bats for 2008. On March 5, 2009, Aaron joined Tom with the Lancaster Barnstormers for 2009.

Jordan Herr, also one of Tom's sons, played for the Lancaster Barnstormers for the 2008 season. At the conclusion of the season, the Chicago White Sox signed him to their Rookie-level affiliate, the Great Falls Voyagers.

See also
 List of St. Louis Cardinals team records
 List of Major League Baseball career stolen bases leaders

References

External links

Tom Herr at Baseball Almanac
Tom Herr at Baseball Gauge
Tom Herr at Ultimate Mets Database

1956 births
Living people
Baseball players from Pennsylvania
Sportspeople from Lancaster, Pennsylvania
St. Louis Cardinals players
Minnesota Twins players
Philadelphia Phillies players
New York Mets players
San Francisco Giants players
Major League Baseball second basemen
National League All-Stars
Minor league baseball managers
Johnson City Cardinals players
St. Petersburg Cardinals players
Arkansas Travelers players
Springfield Redbirds players